Ronald Nico "Ron" van Teylingen (born 28 July 1967, in Boskoop) is a sailor from the Netherlands, who represented his country at the 1992 Summer Olympics in Barcelona. Van Teylingen as helmsman in the Dutch Tornado with Paul Manuel as crew took the 6th place. Four years later at the 1996 Olympics in Savannah with crew Herbert Dercksen Van Teylingen took 9th place again in the Tornado.

Further reading

1992 Olympics (Barcelona)

1996 Olympics (Savannah)

References

Living people
1967 births
People from Boskoop
Dutch male sailors (sport)
Sailors at the 1992 Summer Olympics – Tornado
Sailors at the 1996 Summer Olympics – Tornado
Olympic sailors of the Netherlands
20th-century Dutch people